The Troy Avenue station was a station on the demolished BMT Fulton Street Line in Brooklyn, New York City. It had 2 tracks and 2 side platforms. It was opened sometime during the middle of 1888, and served by trains of the BMT Fulton Street Line. Sometime between 1912 and 1924, the nearby Albany–Sumner Avenues station was closed due to the Dual Contracts addition of a third track between Nostrand Avenue and Hinsdale Street. Commuters from that station were redirected here. It was served by BMT 13 trains throughout its existence. 

The next stop to the west was originally Sumner Avenue, and then replaced by Tompkins Avenue. In 1936, the Independent Subway System built their own Fulton Street subway but did not install a subway station at Troy Avenue. The nearest subway stations to replace the el station were Utica Avenue to the east and Kingston and Throop Avenues to the west. The el station became obsolete, and it closed on May 31, 1940.

References

Defunct BMT Fulton Street Line stations
Railway stations in the United States opened in 1888
Railway stations closed in 1940
Former elevated and subway stations in Brooklyn
1888 establishments in New York (state)
1940 disestablishments in New York (state)